Giovanni Feroce is a 2018 Rhode Island gubernatorial election primary candidate, retired American military officer, former Rhode Island State Senator, and the former CEO of Alex and Ani and Benrus.

Political and military career
Giovanni Feroce graduated with a BA in political science from the University of Rhode Island in 1991. He later graduated from the University of Pennsylvania's Advanced Management Program and from the John F. Kennedy Special Warfare Center and School's Civil Affairs Officer Advance Course. In 1992, at age 24, he was elected to serve in the Rhode Island State Senate; at the time, he was the country’s youngest state senator. There he served on the Corporations and Labor Committees, and as secretary of the Joint Committee for Veteran's Affairs as well as Commissioner of the Rhode Island State Lottery. He retired from the state legislature to run for Rhode Island's Lieutenant Governor, winning the 1994 Republican primary at the age of 26. In 2006, he ran for Delaware State Senate, losing to James T. Vaughn.

Feroce served in the U.S. Army during the Iraq War and was at one time a ground operations officer and Interagency Operations Officer at U.S. Central Command.

On May 20, 2018, Feroce announced his bid for Governor of Rhode Island. One of three candidates on the ballot for the Republican primary, Feroce garnered just 1,147 votes (3.5 percent) to finish a distant third.

Business career
In 2010 Feroce became the CEO of jewelry retailer Alex and Ani. Under Feroce's tenure, Alex and Ani grew from a company with $2.2 million in annual revenue to $79.8 million in 2012 then $230 million in 2013. In 2013 the company was named the fastest growing large company in Rhode Island by the Providence Business News. Feroce has stated that the philosophy behind his leadership and the direction of the company has been "profitability, environmentalism and charity". Feroce has also described a belief in "'resurrecting Main Street' by eschewing the malls 'that destroyed everything'" Feroce stated that, "They call it 'the Alex and Ani effect ... When we open a store on Main Street all of a sudden the chocolatier, the dry cleaner, see their businesses skyrocket." On March 13, 2014, it was announced that Feroce had left the company and founder and creative director, Carolyn Rafaelian, was appointed interim CEO. In 2014, Feroce acquired the license and trademarks for Benrus with the intention of transforming Benrus into a lifestyle brand with wristwatches as the core element. Feroce hired Camille Kostek to become the brand's ambassador. In 2017, Feroce exited Benrus after transferring ownership from the previous owner to a new third party.

He is currently a strategic advisor at Giovanni Feroce Consulting.
He is listed as the top second of the top 100 income-tax-delinquents by the state of Rhode Island, owing $1,010,353.94 as of December 2018 to Rhode Island.

Philanthropy
Feroce has been an executive leader for the American Heart Association HeartBall since 2012 and was Chair of the 2014 event. He was also a Technology Sponsor of the 2013 MET Center for Innovation and Entrepreneurship. In 2013 the Davinci Center for Community Progress presented its Community Humanitarian Award to Feroce. This was in part due to the culture he helped develop at Alex and Ani, centered on the importance of making a positive social impact.

References

Place of birth missing (living people)
Living people
American retail chief executives
Republican Party Rhode Island state senators
United States Army officers
University of Pennsylvania alumni
University of Rhode Island alumni
1968 births